"The Key to Life on Earth" is a song by English singer, songwriter, and musician Declan McKenna. It was released as the second single from his second studio album, Zeros, on 14 April 2020. The song was written by Declan McKenna, Max Marlow and produced by Jay Joyce.

Background
Talking about the song, McKenna said, "'The Key to Life on Earth' reflects on mundanity and hostility. I suppose it's set in suburbia much like my hometown. The video sees two people, who are very similar, in conflict with each other, and I think that's the simplest analogy for the song's purpose."

Music video
A music video to accompany the release of "The Key to Life on Earth" was first released onto YouTube on 15 April 2020. The music video features English actor Alex Lawther. McKenna and Lawther have been compared to each other for years. Talking about the video, McKenna said, "Alex Lawther is someone I've wanted to work with for a long time, I enjoyed watching his roles in Carnage, Black Mirror and The End of the F***ing World, and I was trying to get in contact after seeing how much people compared us online." In an interview with NME, Lawther called McKenna a 'wonderful musician' and that he often gets mistaken for him in public, "Sometimes people come up to me and say: 'I loved your concert last night you were so great'. They think I'm Declan McKenna. McKenna also gets mistaken for Lawther too."

Track listing

Personnel
Credits adapted from Tidal.
 Jay Joyce – producer
 Declan McKenna – composer, lyricist, associated performer, bass, guitar, synthesizer, vocal
 Max Marlow – composer, lyricist
 Court Blankenship – assistant engineer
 Jimmy Mansfield – assistant engineer
 Gabrielle King – background vocal, drums
 Isabel Torres – background vocal, guitar
 Nathan Cox – background vocal, bass, keyboards, synthesizer, xylophone
 Jason Hall – engineer
 Matt Wolach – engineer
 Michael Freeman – engineer
 Matt Colton – mastering engineer
 Mark 'Spike' Stent – mixing engineer

Charts

Release history

References

2020 songs
2020 singles
Declan McKenna songs
Song recordings produced by Jay Joyce